The 1978 Rothmans International Series was an Australian motor racing competition open to Australian Formula 1 cars. The series, which was the third Rothmans International Series, was won by Warwick Brown, driving a Lola T332 Chevrolet.

Schedule
The series was contested over four rounds with one race per round.

Points system
Series points were awarded on a 9-6-4-3-2-1 basis for the first six places at each round.

Series results

References

Rothmans International Series
Rothmans
Australian Formula 1
Formula 5000